The 1906 Wellington City mayoral election was part of the New Zealand local elections held that same year. In 1906, elections were held for the Mayor of Wellington plus other local government positions. The polling was conducted using the standard first-past-the-post electoral method.

Background
Thomas William Hislop, the incumbent Mayor, sought re-election and retained office unopposed with no other candidates emerging. The mayoral contest coincided with a vacancy on the Wellington City Council following the resignation of councillor Arthur Gibbs triggering a by-election. Nine candidates contested the seat which was ultimately won by ex-councillor John Smith Jr. who had unsuccessfully stood for mayor against Hislop the previous year.

Council by-election

References

Mayoral elections in Wellington
1906 elections in New Zealand
Politics of the Wellington Region
April 1906 events
1900s in Wellington